Procisne  (Protisne) is a settlement in the administrative district of Gmina Lutowiska, within Bieszczady County, Subcarpathian Voivodeship, in south-eastern Poland, close to the border with Ukraine.

The settlement has a population of 52.

References

Procisne